An Khê is a town (thị xã) of Gia Lai province in the Central Highlands region of Vietnam.

As of 2003 the district had a population of 63,118. The district covers an area of 199 km². The district capital lies at An Khê.

Located on the main highway, QL-19, between Qui Nhơn on the coast and Pleiku in the Central Highlands, An Khê was of strategic significance during the Vietnam War.

History 
During the early 15th century, An Khe was a Cham/highlander city bore the name Samriddhipuri (City of Virtue, Richness).

First Indochina War 

The Battle of Mang Yang Pass, the last major battle of the First Indochinese War, started near An Khê: on June 24, 1954, French colonial Groupe Mobile 100 received orders to abandon its defensive position at An Khê and to fall back to the safer Pleiku, some 50 miles away over Route Coloniale 19. At the road marker 'Kilometer 15' the column was ambushed by Việt Minh troops belonging to the 803rd Regiment and suffered heavy losses.

Second Indochina War 

In August 1965 the U.S. 1st Cavalry Division established their main base, Camp Radcliff, near An Khê. In September of that year, the Battle of An Ninh took place about 30 km east of the town. Camp Radcliff remained in use by various U.S. Army units until late 1970 after which it was turned over to the ARVN.

References

External links
 
 
 
 

Districts of Gia Lai province
County-level towns in Vietnam
Populated places in Gia Lai province

es:An Khe